John Shaw McMillan (born 14 April 1937) is a Scottish footballer, who played for Dumbarton, Cardiff City and Exeter City.

In 1957 McMillan joined Dumbarton, as an amateur, He caught the eye by hitting 10 goals in
30 matches for the Sons, and on 3 February 1958 he played in a Scottish Amateur XI trial match against his home club Dumbarton in a 2–2 draw, scoring one of the goals. At the time he was working at the Royal Navy torpedo factory in Alexandria and
still had three months of his apprenticeship to go.

He then joined Cardiff City where he stay for four seasons, but it was difficult for him to make the first team. He was doing his national service at the time and played for the RAF team.

He then joined Exeter City McMillan scored on his debut in a 1–1 draw against Oldham.

Family reasons then took McMillan back to Wales, he went to Margate briefly, but his wife wanted to be closer to her mother in Cardiff and he joined Barry Town of the Southern League. One of the reasons he joined Barry Town was he would be able to get a job with the shipping repair firm at Barry Docks owned by the family of John Bailey, the club's chairman at the time.

He later played for Merthyr Tydfil before slipping down into the Welsh Leagues.

Now in his eighties, McMillan still lives in the Vale of Glamorgan.

References

External links

1937 births
Scottish footballers
Dumbarton F.C. players
Scottish Football League players
Living people
Cardiff City F.C. players
Exeter City F.C. players
English Football League players
Association football wingers